Léonor (also known as Mistress of the Devil) is a 1975 French-Italian-Spanish horror film written and directed by Juan Luis Buñuel (the son of Luis Buñuel) and starring  Michel Piccoli,  Liv Ullmann  and  Ornella Muti.

Plot

Cast

Michel Piccoli as Richard
Liv Ullmann as Leonor
Ornella Muti as  Catherine
Antonio Ferrandis as  Thomas
Ángel del Pozo as  Chaplain
George Rigaud as  Catherine's Father
José María Caffarel as The Doctor
Carmen Maura
Piero Vida 
José Guardiola
Tito García

Release

Home media
The film was released for the first time on DVD and Blu-ray by Scorpion Releasing on August 21, 2018.

See also
 "Wake Not the Dead", the short story that the film is based on

References

External links
 
 
 

French horror films
Italian horror films
Spanish horror films
1970s crime films
Crime horror films
Folk horror films
Films set in the Middle Ages
Films scored by Ennio Morricone
1970s French films
1970s Italian films